Startup Village is a not-for-profit business incubator based in Kochi, Kerala, India, started in April 2012. The organisation aimed  to launch 1,000 technology startups over the next ten years and start the search for the next billion-dollar Indian company. It focusses primarily on student startups and telecom innovation. It is India's first incubator that is funded jointly by the public and private sectors. As of October 2013, Startup Village has supported 450 startups through Incubation and Virtual Incubation combined. Businessman Kris Gopalakrishnan is the chief mentor at Startup Village.

On 1 January 2016, Kerala Startup Mission took over the physical space of the Startup Village at Hi-Tech Park in Kalamassery.

Administration 

Sijo Kuruvilla George was the first chief executive officer of Startup Village until June 2014. Pranav Kumar Suresh, Chief Operating Officer took over from Sijo Kuruvilla George as chief executive officer in July 2014. Kris Gopalakrishnan, co-founder of Infosys was the chief mentor at Startup Village.

Incubation program 
Startup Village provides members with workspace, high-speed Internet connection, legal and intellectual property services and access to high-profile investors. Companies can also apply for the Startup Village Angel Fund that has been approved by SEBI. They also have access to all the workshops, networking events and contests at Startup Village. Every month, Startup Village holds a community gathering where would-be entrepreneurs can connect with investors, technology innovators and famous businesspersons. Interested founders can join an open house session that is held every Saturday at Startup Village's Kochi campus to connect with the team and brainstorm with other like-minded people. They can then apply online if they wish to enrol for the incubation program. The Startup Village has set up a similar incubation facility in Visakhapatnam, Andhra Pradesh with the name Sunrise startup village. Data analytics company Unihalt is the first financially sustainable startup mentored by Startup Village.

SVSquare 

In January 2013, Startup Village and the Kerala government launched an initiative called SVSquare. Every year, the Startup Village panel would select promising young entrepreneurs from India and send them on an all-expense-paid trip to the U.S. The aim is to expose Indian youth to the legendary startup environment in Silicon Valley. This will also give them a chance to interact with some of the famous tech gurus and entrepreneurs in the world.

References

External links

Exciting response to 'Startup Village' in Kerala, says Chairman
Startup Village spurs Kerala's Student Entrepreneurship Policy
"Startup Village to help entrepreneurs grow"
"A village like no other". Business Standard.

Business incubators of India
Companies based in Kochi
Non-profit organisations based in India
Indian companies established in 2012
2012 establishments in Kerala